General António Sebastião Dembo (1944 – February 25, 2002) served as Vice President (1992–2002) and later President (2002) of UNITA, an anti-Communist rebel group that fought against the MPLA in the Angolan Civil War.

Born to Sebastião and Muhemba Nabuko in Nambuangongo, Bengo Province, he completed his primary schooling at Muxaluando and Quimai Methodist schools. His secondary education was at El Harrach and École Nationale d'Ingénieurs et Techniciens d'Algérie in Algeria.

António Dembo joined UNITA in 1969. After traveling throughout Africa on behalf of UNITA, he returned in 1982 to become commander for the Northern Front and later the Northern Front chief of staff. He became UNITA's Vice President in 1992 when the Angolan Civil War resumed, succeeding Jeremias Chitunda, who was assassinated by the Angolan government in Luanda that year. He also became the general in charge of UNITA's Special Commandos, the Tupamaros.

After the war turned against UNITA in 2001–2002, Dembo's forces were constantly on the run from government troops. Following the death in battle of its leader Jonas Savimbi on February 22, 2002, Dembo became the President of UNITA. However, Dembo was also wounded in the same attack that killed Savimbi and, already weakened by diabetes, died three days later.

Dembo's succession of Savimbi had been pre-ordained by Savimbi and the UNITA leadership. In 1997, Savimbi and the UNITA leadership named Dembo Savimbi's successor in the event of Savimbi's death. Consistent with this pre-ordained succession, Dembo assumed leadership of UNITA immediately following Savimbi's death in combat.

Following Dembo's death, UNITA's leadership was assumed by Isaías Samakuva, who had served as UNITA's ambassador to Europe under Savimbi.

References
 W. Martin James. Historical Dictionary of Angola, p. 45. Scarecrow Press (2004),

External links
"Angola Rebels Demand Death Probe," BBC News, February 28, 2002.
"UNITA Successor Dead," Pravda, June 3, 2002.

1944 births
2002 deaths
People from Bengo Province
Angolan anti-communists
People of the Angolan Civil War
Angolan rebels
Assassinated Angolan politicians
Deaths by firearm in Angola
Members of UNITA
UNITA politicians
20th-century Angolan people
21st-century Angolan people